In electronics, an analog multiplier is a device that takes two analog signals and produces an output which is their product. Such circuits can be used to implement related functions such as squares (apply same signal to both inputs), and square roots.

An electronic analog multiplier can be called by several names, depending on the function it is used to serve (see analog multiplier applications).

Voltage-controlled amplifier versus analog multiplier 
If one input of an analog multiplier is held at a steady-state voltage, a signal at the second input will be scaled in proportion to the level on the fixed input. In this case, the analog multiplier may be considered to be a voltage controlled amplifier. Obvious applications would be for electronic volume control and automatic gain control (AGC). Although analog multipliers are often used for such applications, voltage-controlled amplifiers are not necessarily true analog multipliers. For example, an integrated circuit designed to be used as a volume control may have a signal input designed for 1 Vp-p, and a control input designed for 0-5 V dc; that is, the two inputs are not symmetrical and the control input will have a limited bandwidth.

By contrast, in what is generally considered to be a true analog multiplier, the two signal inputs have identical characteristics. Applications specific to a true analog multiplier are those where both inputs are signals, for example in a frequency mixer or an analog circuit to implement a discrete Fourier transform. Due to the precision required for the device to be accurate and linear over the input range a true analog multiplier is generally a much more expensive part than a voltage-controlled amplifier.

A four-quadrant multiplier is one where inputs and outputs may swing positive and negative. Many multipliers only work in 2 quadrants (one input may only have one polarity), or single quadrant (inputs and outputs have only one polarity, usually all positive).

Analog multiplier devices 
Analog multiplication can be accomplished by using the Hall Effect.

The Gilbert cell is a circuit whose output current is a 4 quadrant multiplication of its two differential inputs.

Integrated circuits analog multipliers are incorporated into many applications, such as a true RMS converter, but a number of general purpose analog multiplier building blocks are available such as the Linear Four Quadrant Multiplier. General-purpose devices will usually include attenuators or amplifiers on the inputs or outputs in order to allow the signal to be scaled within the voltage limits of the circuit.

Although analog multiplier circuits are very similar to operational amplifiers, they are far more susceptible to noise and offset voltage-related problems as these errors may become multiplied. When dealing with high-frequency signals, phase-related problems may be quite complex. For this reason, manufacturing wide-range general-purpose analog multipliers is far more difficult than ordinary operational amplifiers, and such devices are typically produced using specialist technologies and laser trimming, as are those used for high-performance amplifiers such as instrumentation amplifiers. This means they have a relatively high cost and so they are generally used only for circuits where they are indispensable.

Some commonly available Analog Multiplier ICs in the market are MPY634 from Texas Instruments, AD534, AD632 and AD734 from Analog Devices, HA-2556 from Intersil and many more from other IC manufacturers.

Analog versus digital tradeoff in multiplication 
In most cases, the functions performed by an analog multiplier may be performed better and at lower cost using digital signal processing techniques. At low frequencies, a digital solution is cheaper and more effective and allows the circuit function to be modified in firmware. As frequencies rise, the cost of implementing digital solutions increases much more steeply than for analog solutions. As digital technology advances, the use of analog multipliers tends to be ever more marginalized towards higher-frequency circuits or very specialized applications.

In addition, most signals are now destined to become digitized sooner or later in the signal path, and if at all possible the functions that would require a multiplier tend to be moved to the digital side. For example, in early digital multimeters, true RMS functions were provided by external analog multiplier circuits. Nowadays (with the exception of high-frequency measurements) the tendency is to increase the sampling rate of the ADC in order to digitize the input signal allowing RMS and a whole range of other functions to be carried out by a digital processor. However, blindly digitizing the signal as early in the signal path as possible costs unreasonable amounts of power due to the need for high-speed ADCs. A much more efficient solution involves analog preprocessing to condition the signal and reduce its bandwidth so that energy is spent to digitize only the bandwidth that contains useful information.

In addition, digitally controlled resistors allow microcontrollers to implement many functions such as tone control and AGC without having to process the digitized signal directly.

Analog multiplier applications 

 Variable-gain amplifier
 Ring modulator
 Product detector
 Frequency mixer
 Companding
 Squelch
 Analog computer
 Analog signal processing
 Automatic gain control
 True RMS converter
 Analog filters (especially voltage-controlled filters)
 PAM-pulse amplitude modulation

Further reading 
 Multipliers vs. Modulators Analog Dialogue, June 2013

See also 
 NE612, oscillator and a Gilbert cell multiplier mixer.

References 

Frequency mixers
Analog circuits